The 637th Radar Squadron is an inactive United States Air Force unit. It was last assigned to the 25th Air Division, Aerospace Defense Command, stationed at Othello Air Force Station, Washington.

History
The squadron was originally activated at Long Beach Municipal Airport CA as the 637th Aircraft Control & Warning Squadron as part of the initial cold war air defenses of the Western United States. The following year it moved to Lashup Site L-32 at McChord AFB, WA.   In 1959, it moved to Site L-29 at Moses Lake AFB, WA.

The squadron finally moved to its final station at site LP-40 (later P-40, Z-40) on Saddle Mountain, WA in 1951.   In 1960, the unit was integrated into the Semi Automatic Ground Environment (SAGE) control system and was redesignated the 637th Radar Squadron (SAGE).   Because it was stationed at a Backup Interceptor Control (BUIC) site, it was inactivated in 1970 and replaced by the like numbered 637th Air Defense Group (ADG).  As defense systems against manned bomber threats were reduced, it was activated once again in 1974 to replace the 637th ADG.  It was last inactivated on 31 March 1975.

The unit was a General Surveillance Radar squadron providing for the air defense of the United States.

Lineage
  Constituted as the 637th Aircraft Control and Warning Squadron, 1947
 Activated on 21 May 1947
 Redesignated 637th Radar Squadron (SAGE), 1 September 1960
 Inactivated, 1 March 1970
 Activated, 1 January 1974
 Inactivated on 31 March 1975

Assignments
 505th Aircraft Control and Warning Group, 21 May 1947
 162d Aircraft Control and Warning Group (Federalized AZ ANG), 25 May 1951
 25th Air Division, 6 February 1952
 4702d Defense Wing, 1 January 1953
 9th Air Division, 8 October 1954
 25th Air Division, 15 August 1958
 4700th Air Defense Wing, 1 September 1958
 Spokane Air Defense Sector, 15 March 1960
 Seattle Air Defense Sector, 1 September 1963
 25th Air Division, 1 April 1966 - 1 March 1970
 25th Air Division, 1 January 1974 - 31 March 1975
 Source

Stations
 Long Beach Municipal Airport, CA, 21 May 1947
 McChord AFB, WA, 16 April 1948
 Moses Lake AFB (later Larson AFB) WA, 1 May 1949
 Saddle Mountain, WA, 1 January 1951
 Site renamed Othello Air Force Station, 1 December 1953 - 31 March 1975
 Source

References

External links

Radar squadrons of the United States Air Force
Aerospace Defense Command units